Chong Nonsi Canal Park (Thai: สวนสาธารณะคลองช่องนนทรี) is a linear park in Khlong Chong Nonsi, Sathorn, Bangkok. Designed by Thai landscape architecture firm Landprocess, the first of five phases of the park opened in December 2021.

References 

Linear parks
Urban public parks
Parks in Bangkok
2021 establishments in Thailand